The 1962 NFL Championship Game was the 30th NFL title game, played on December 30 at Yankee Stadium in New York City. It matched the New York Giants (12–2) of the Eastern Conference and Green Bay Packers (13–1) of the Western Conference, the defending league champions.

The Packers were led by hall of fame head coach Vince Lombardi, in his fourth year, and the Giants by Allie Sherman, in his second season. Green Bay was favored by 6½ points. The attendance for the game was 64,892, and the weather during the game was so cold that television crews used bonfires to thaw out their cameras, and one cameraman suffered frostbite. The conditions also made throwing the ball difficult.

Green Bay won 16–7, behind the performances of game Most Valuable Player linebacker Ray Nitschke, and fullback Jim Taylor. Right guard Jerry Kramer, filling in as placekicker for the injured Paul Hornung, scored ten points with three field goals and an extra point. The Giants fumbled twice, with Nitschke recovering both for the Packers, while the Packers recovered all five of their own fumbles and intercepted a Giants pass.

This was the third and final NFL title game played at Yankee Stadium; the others were in 1956 and 1958, with the Giants winning the first. There was not another NFL title game in greater New York City for 51 seasons until Super Bowl XLVIII in February 2014 at MetLife Stadium, and resulted in the Seattle Seahawks defeating the Denver Broncos 43–8. (The 1968 AFL Championship Game was played at Shea Stadium in Queens, with the Jets defeating the Oakland Raiders 27–23; the Jets then upset the Baltimore Colts 16–7 in Super Bowl III in Miami.)

Previous championship games hosted by the Giants in New York were played across the Harlem River at the Polo Grounds in 1934, 1938, 1944, and 1946; the Giants won the first two. An additional title game was played at the Polo Grounds in 1936, hosted by the Boston Redskins and won by the Packers.

Background
The 1962 game was a rematch of the 1961 game, won by Green Bay at home, 37–0. It was the Packers' third straight appearance in the championship game, and the Giants' fourth in five seasons, and fifth in the last seven.

Green Bay began the  season 10–0, including a 49–0 victory over the Philadelphia Eagles, where they gained 628 yards to Philadelphia's 54. Before the game, 10,000 fans at a New York Knicks game in Madison Square Garden spontaneously began chanting "Beat Green Bay! Beat Green Bay!", and when the 18,000 tickets available to non-season ticket holders went on sale, they sold within three hours.

Due to the NFL's blackout policy which aimed to protect gate receipts, until , fans in a team's home market could not watch their team's regular season and playoff games on television, even if they were title games. New York fans made reservations for motels in Pennsylvania, New Jersey, and Connecticut so they could watch the game out of the  blackout zone, and even though the game was played in  temperatures with  winds, only 299 of the 65,000+ Giant fans who bought tickets to the sold out game stayed home.

Although the weather was temperate the previous day, during the contest it became so cold due to wind chill that a cameraman filming the game suffered frostbite, and television crews used dugout bonfires to thaw out their cameras. Broadcaster Art Rust, Jr. later described the weather as "barbaric". The cold conditions favored the Packers who used a run-oriented offense led by Taylor, while the Giants featured a more pass-heavy offense led by quarterback Y. A. Tittle who had passed for 3,224 yards and 33 touchdowns in the regular season.

Ticket prices for the game at Yankee Stadium ranged from eight to twelve dollars ($68.11 to $100.13 in 2018 valuation).

Game summary
The wind caused the ball to be blown off the tee three times during the opening kickoff, and a Green Bay player had to hold the ball onto the tee so Willie Wood (later ejected for bumping back judge Tom Kelleher) could kick it off. After a Jerry Kramer field goal made the score 3–0 in favor of Green Bay in the first quarter, the Giants drove to the Green Bay 15 yard line behind short passes from Tittle. Tittle then tried to hit tight end Joe Walton near the goal line, but a timely Packer blitz by Forester and Nitschke allowed the latter to deflect the pass which was intercepted by fellow linebacker Dan Currie. During most of the first and second quarter, the teams ran the ball for short gains. The Giants repeatedly hit Taylor hard, and he suffered cuts to his arm and tongue. Near halftime, the Giants Phil King fumbled on their own 28, and Nitschke recovered. A halfback option pass from Paul Hornung to flanker Boyd Dowler took the Packers to the Giants seven-yard line. On the following play Taylor used an outside fake before going back inside to run untouched into the end zone.

The weather worsened by halftime and the wind swirled dust around the stadium, tearing apart the ballpark's U.S. flag, and knocking over a television camera. Passing became even more difficult; the longest pass of the day was a 25-yard one from Tittle to Walton. After blocking a Max McGee punt and recovering it for a touchdown to pull the game to 10–7 in the third quarter, the Giants defense forced the Packers into a three and out on their next possession. Sam Horner fumbled on a punt return at the Giants 42-yard line however, and Nitschke recovered. Five plays later, Kramer kicked a field goal to make the score 13–7. Tittle, with the aid of two Packers penalties, then drove the Giants from their own 20 to the Green Bay 18 on the ensuing drive. New York then incurred two holding penalties, pushing them back to their own 40-yard line and ending their drive (holding penalties at the time were assessed from the spot of the foul). Led by Taylor, who repeatedly ran for key first downs, the Packers advanced the ball down to the New York end of the field, where Kramer kicked a third field goal (on five attempts) to make the score 16–7 with under two minutes to play. Tittle led a desperation drive which ended at the Packer 7 as time ran out. Green Bay recovered all five of their fumbles during the game, while the Giants lost both of theirs. Kramer had not played in the previous year's title game, after a lower leg injury in late October sidelined him for the rest of the 1961 season.

Legacy

A few hours after this game, Nitschke, who was the game's Most Valuable Player, appeared on CBS TV's What's My Line? wearing thick eyeglasses and a dark, conservative suit to hide his size. Panelists Martin Gabel and Bennett Cerf, both of whom were at the game and both Giants fans, recognized him. As the game's outstanding player, Nitschke was awarded a 1963 Chevrolet Corvette by Sport magazine.

Ed Sabol's film company, Blair Motion Pictures, paid $3,000 for the film rights for the game; the company would later become NFL Films.

The 1962 Packers team is considered one of the best in NFL history. 11 members of the 1962 Packer team are in the Hall of Fame in Canton, Ohio.

Scoring summary
Sunday, December 30, 1962
Kickoff: 2:05 p.m. EST

First quarter
GB - Jerry Kramer 26-yard field goal, GB 3–0
Second quarter
GB - Jim Taylor 7-yard run (Kramer kick), GB 10–0
Third quarter
NY - Jim Collier block punt recovery in end zone (Don Chandler kick), GB 10–7
GB - Kramer 29-yard field goal, GB 13–7
Fourth quarter
GB - Kramer 30-yard field goal, GB 16–7

Starting lineups

Officials
Referee: (9) Emil Heintz
Umpire: (57) Joseph Connell
Head Linesman: (30) George Murphy
Back Judge: (25) Tom Kelleher
Field Judge: (21) Fred Swearingen

Players' shares
The gross receipts for the game, including $615,000 radio and television rights, were just under $1,243,000, the highest to date. Each player on the winning Packers team received $5,888, while Giants players made $4,166 each.

Quotes

See also
 1962 NFL season
 History of the National Football League championship
 1962 American Football League Championship Game

Video
 YouTube – 1962 NFL Championship - Green Bay Packers at New York Giants (Highlights)

References

Gottehrer, Barry. The Giants of New York, the history of professional football's most fabulous dynasty. New York, G. P. Putnam's Sons, 1963 

Championship Game
National Football League Championship games
Green Bay Packers postseason
New York Giants postseason
Sports in the Bronx
American football competitions in New York City
NFL Championship Game
NFL Championship Game
1960s in the Bronx